Bellevue Park was the name of a stadium used for football games in what is today Green Bay, Wisconsin. The park was just east of the Hagemeister Brewery, which was renamed the "Bellevue Products Co." during Prohibition, and was located just east of Baird Creek along Main Street in the village of Preble, Wisconsin.

A minor league baseball park, it was the home of the Green Bay Packers of the National Football League in 1923 and 1924. Bellevue Park was the second home venue of the Packers, who had previously played their home games at Hagemeister Park. During their tenure at Bellevue Park, the Packers became more popular, with game attendance ranging from 4,000 to 5,000 spectators.

Because Bellevue Park was lacking virtually every facility required for football and was too far out of town, in 1925, the Packers moved their games to the then brand new City Stadium.

External links
LambeauField.com page, "Packers Stadium History"

Defunct National Football League venues
Green Bay Packers stadiums
American football venues in Wisconsin
Sports venues in Green Bay, Wisconsin